Blumea sericea, also known as silky dwarf bush, is a species of flowering plants in the fleabane tribe within the sunflower family. It has been placed as the sole species Nanothamnus sericeus in the monotypic genus Nanothamnus.  It is native to India (Maharashtra and Karnataka).

References

Endemic flora of India (region)
Inuleae